Promecosoma is a genus of leaf beetles in the subfamily Eumolpinae. There are 26 described species in Promecosoma. Most species are found in Mexico, though two species are also known from southern Arizona.

Species
These species belong to the genus Promecosoma:

 Promecosoma abdominale Lefèvre, 1877
 Promecosoma acuminatum Weise, 1922
 Promecosoma arizonae (Crotch, 1873) i c b
 Promecosoma chrysis Lefèvre, 1877
 Promecosoma cinctipenne Lefèvre, 1877
 Promecosoma dentatum Weise, 1922
 Promecosoma dilatatum Lefèvre, 1877
 Promecosoma dispar Lefèvre, 1877
 Promecosoma dugesi Lefèvre, 1877
 Promecosoma ecuadoriense Bechyné, 1953
 Promecosoma elegantulum Lefèvre, 1877
 Promecosoma emarginatum Weise, 1922
 Promecosoma fervidum Lefèvre, 1877
 Promecosoma flohri Jacoby, 1890
 Promecosoma inflatum Lefèvre, 1877 i c g b
 Promecosoma itataiense Bechyné, 1953
 Promecosoma jucundum Lefèvre, 1877
 Promecosoma lepidum Lefèvre, 1877
 Promecosoma lugens Lefèvre, 1877
 Promecosoma nobilitatum Lefèvre, 1877
 Promecosoma sallei Lefèvre, 1877
 Promecosoma sanguinolatum Lefèvre, 1877
 Promecosoma scutellare Lefèvre, 1877
 Promecosoma suturale Jacoby, 1890
 Promecosoma venezuelanum Bechyné, 1955
 Promecosoma viride Jacoby, 1881

Data sources: i = ITIS, c = Catalogue of Life, g = GBIF, b = Bugguide.net

References

Further reading

 
 

Eumolpinae
Chrysomelidae genera
Beetles of North America
Articles created by Qbugbot
Taxa named by Édouard Lefèvre